Burn is an EP/single by American heavy metal band Fear Factory, released in 1997 by Roadrunner Records. The title track, "Burn", is a remix of "Flashpoint" (a track from the Demanufacture album), which appears on the Remanufacture album. Burn has sold over 5,000 copies.

Track listing
EP

12" single

1997 EPs
Fear Factory EPs
Remix EPs
Roadrunner Records EPs